Garaj Mahal is a jazz fusion band formed in 2000 that combines jazz, rock, Indian music, and funk. The band consists of Fareed Haque (guitar), Kai Eckhardt (bass), Sean Rickman (drums), and Eric Levy (keyboards). Garaj Mahal allows its music to be recorded at concerts.

In early 2007, Mahal's Blueberry Cave won Best Jam Album in the 6th Annual Independent Music Awards

Discography
 Live Vol. 1 (Harmonized, 2003)
 Live Vol. 2 (Harmonized, 2003)
 Live Vol. 3 (Harmonized, 2003)
 Mondo Garaj (Harmonized, 2003)
 Blueberry Cave (Harmonized, 2005)
 w00t (Owl, 2008)
 More Mr. Nice Guy (Owl, 2010)
 Discovery:The Moog Guitar (2010)

References

External links
Garaj Mahal on Youtube
Garaj Mahal collection at the Internet Archive's live music archive
 Blueberry Cave review from allaboutjazz

American funk musical groups
Jam bands
Jazz fusion ensembles
Independent Music Awards winners
Owl Studios artists